Omnipeek is a packet analyzer software tool from Savvius, a LiveAction company, for network troubleshooting and protocol analysis. It supports an application programming interface (API) for plugins.

History 
Savvius (formerly WildPackets) was founded in 1990 as The AG Group by Mahboud Zabetian and Tim McCreery. In 2000 the company changed its name to WildPackets to address the popular market it had developed for its products. The first product by the company was written for the Macintosh and was called EtherPeek. It was the first affordable software-only protocol analyzer for Ethernet networks. It was later ported to Microsoft Windows, which was released in 1997. Earlier, LocalPeek and TokenPeek were developed for LocalTalk and Token Ring networks respectively. In 2001, AiroPeek was released, which added support for wireless IEEE 802.11 (marketed with the Wi-Fi brand) networks. In 2003, the OmniEngine Distributed Capture Engine was released as software, and as a hardware network recorder appliance.

In the early morning of July 15, 2002, WildPackets' building in Walnut Creek, California burnt to the ground including everything in it. However, no one was hurt and the employees regrouped at a new location and the company survived the fire.

Mid-April 2015, the company changed its name from WildPackets to Savvius and broadened its focus to include network security.

In June 2018, Savvius was acquired by LiveAction, a company that provides network performance management, visualization and analytics software.

Acquisitions 
Savvius acquired Net3 Group in November 2000. Their product, NetSense, an expert system for network troubleshooting, was converted initially converted into a plug-in and then later fully integrated into a new version of the product called EtherPeekNX. 
  
Savvius acquired Optimized Engineering Corporation in 2001. Optimized network analysis instructors, training courses and certifications were added to Savvius' services.

Extensibility 
Omnipeek has APIs on the front-end for automation, on the back-end for analysis, as well as other mechanisms to extend and enhance the program. BODY.SAYED

There are 40 plug-ins available for the Omnipeek Platform. These plug-ins range from logging extensions to full-blown applications that are hosted by OmniPeek.

Remote Adapters: provide a means to capture packets and stats. There are remote adapters to capture from RMON, NetFlow, SFlow, Cisco AP's, Aruba AP's, and Linux boxes. Adapters are available to aggregate packets from multiple network segments and wireless channels at the same time.

The most notable decoders are the protospecs and decoder files, which are interpreted text files that can be extended by the user to enhance the display and analysis of existing protocols, and add knowledge of completely new protocols, without releasing new versions of the application.

The plugin Wizards for the Omnipeek Console and the OmniEngine are Microsoft Visual Studio Project Templates that generate working plug-ins. When the wizard is run, a dialog appears providing options for types of functionality that sample code will be generated for. When the wizard is complete, the user is left with a working plugin with entry points for adding application logic. These plug-in wizards enable the development of extensions to Omnipeek.    
 
The MyPeek Community Portal is a website dedicated to the extension of Omnipeek. It provides plug-ins, scripts, adapters, tools, and various levels of support for the plug-ins posted there, and expertise for those interested in extending Omnipeek themselves.

PlaceMap: is a freely available standalone Google Maps Packet sniffer application for Windows that captures network traffic and maps nodes to the Google Map. PlaceMap is a notable example of extensibility in that it uses exactly the same Google Map plugin that is also available for the Omnipeek, and it uses the peek driver API to capture packets.

Example Plugins 
Google Map Plugin - map nodes to a Google Map
SQLFilter Plugin - save and query packets from a database
PeekPlayer Plugin - send packet an adapter or a capture window
PowerBar Plugin - write scripts that process packets
Decoder Plugin - decode packets
WatchMe Plugin - display web sites in real-time from URLs
Browser Plugin - construct and display web pages from packets
IM Plugin - display instant message screen names and chat
WebStats Plugin - collect and report web statistics
Remote TCPDump Adapter Plugin - stream packets from any machine with SSH and tcpdump
Cisco Remote Adapter Plugin - stream packets from Cisco Access Points
Aruba Remote Adapter Plugin - stream packets from Aruba Networks Air Monitors

References

External links
https://www.liveaction.com 
Network World, Sept. 18, 2006: Review of WildPackets' OmniPeek.  By Anthony Mosco, Robert Smithers, Robert Tarpley
Network World , April 23, 2007:  WLAN analyzers: WildPackets' OmniPeek For Windows 4.1. By Tom Henderson, Rand Dvorak
IT Week. Network IT Week, 19 Aug 2006, by Dave Bailey. WildPackets' latest OmniPeek tool makes it easier to inspect traffic and troubleshoot networks. Tested: WildPackets OmniPeek Enterprise 4.0
Network World, March 10, 2008: Clear Choice Test VoIP analysis tools.   By Rob Smithers of Miercom
Cisco Website, Mar. 22, 2006: LWAPP Decodes Enablement on WildPackets OmniPeek and EtherPeek 3.0 Software

Network analyzers
Packets (information technology)